Peter Teulon Beamish (11 January 1824 – 20 August 1914) was  Archdeacon of Melbourne  from 1878 until 1898.
 
Beamish was born in County Cork and educated at Trinity College, Dublin. He received the degree of Doctor of Divinity (DD). He was ordained deacon at Sydney in 1847, and priest at Melbourne in 1850. After a curacies at Singleton, New South Wales and Illawarra he was Vicar of Warrnambool from 1850 to 1895.

References

1824 births
People from County Cork
Irish emigrants to colonial Australia
Alumni of Trinity College Dublin
Archdeacons of Melbourne
1914 deaths